Simone Scattolin (born 1 October 1976) is an Italian rally co-driver. In addition to be the regular co-driver of Lorenzo Bertelli, he also competes in the European Rally Championship.

Rally results

WRC results

* Season still in progress.

References

External links
 Simone Scattolin's e-wrc profile

1976 births
Living people
Italian rally co-drivers
World Rally Championship co-drivers